The 1913 Auckland City mayoral election was part of the New Zealand local elections held that same year. In 1913, elections were held for the Mayor of Auckland plus other local government positions including eighteen city councillors. The polling was conducted using the standard first-past-the-post electoral method.

Background
James Parr was re-elected unopposed. In 1913 the Borough of Parnell was amalgamated with Auckland City which saw the number of councillors increased from fifteen to eighteen.

Councillor results

Notes

References

Mayoral elections in Auckland
1913 elections in New Zealand
Politics of the Auckland Region
1910s in Auckland